A by-election for the seat of Port Melbourne in the Victorian Legislative Assembly was held on Saturday 15 March 1952. The by-election was triggered by the death of Labor member Tom Corrigan on 19 January 1952.

The candidates were Stan Corrigan (Tom Corrigan's son) for the Labor Party, William Bird (secretary of the Melbourne branch of the Seamen's Union) for the Communist Party, and Kenneth Cole for the Liberal and Country Party. Labor retained the seat with Corrigan winning by a large majority.

Results

References

1952 elections in Australia
Victorian state by-elections
1950s in Melbourne